Khartoum North or Khartoum Bahri is a city in Khartoum State, lying to the north of Khartoum city, the capital of Sudan. It is located on the north bank of the Blue Nile and the east bank of the River Nile, near the confluence of the Blue Nile with the White, and bridges connect it with both Khartoum to its south and Omdurman to its west.

It had a population of 1,012,211 at the last Sudanese census in 2008. It is part of a three-city agglomeration (with Khartoum proper and Omdurman) with a combined population of 4,272,728 in 2008.

Demographics

History
The original settlement at Khartoum North, Halfaya, was long the largest settlement in the area of the Nile confluence before the Egyptians established Khartoum as their military garrison and administrative center in the 1820s. It was thereafter eclipsed by the Egyptian Khartoum, its Mahdist replacement Omdurman, and the British refounding of Khartoum following their reconquest of the country in 1898. Khartoum North began to grow again, however, as the southern terminus of the Sudan Military Railroad, which was completed in 1899. (The Blue Nile was bridged in 1910 and the line extended to Sennar, but Khartoum North continued to serve as the main railroad station and yard.)

On August 20, 1998 the Al-Shifa pharmaceutical factory was destroyed by a cruise missile because the United States accused the factory of making VX (nerve agent) for al-Qaeda.

Economy and industry
The industrial centre of the region and the country, the neighborhood  contains dockyards, marine and rail workshops, and sawmills. Khartoum North trades in cotton, grains, fruit, and livestock; industries include tanning, brewing, brickmaking, textile weaving, and food processing. Since the year 2000, chemical plants supplying household products to the rest of the country have been built in the neighborhood .

A wealthy suburb is growing towards the eastern part of the neighborhood, along the Blue Nile.

Neighbourhoods
Khartoum North has many neighborhoods, some of which are:
Alamlaak
Kober
Kafouri
Bahri Industrial Area
Al Haj Yousif
Al Sababi
Al Dnagla North
Al Dnagla South
Hilat Hamad
Hilat Khojali
Hilat Koko
Alshabia North
Alshabia South
Almazad
Almugtaribin
Almerghania
Alsafia
Shambat
Khoglab
Alqadisia
السامراب
الدروشاب
حطاب
دردوق
الحلفايه
العزبه
الكدرو
ابو حليمه
الجيلي
نبته
الفكي هاشم

Infrastructure

Bridges
The following bridges cross the Blue Nile and connect Khartoum North to Khartoum: 
Mac Nimir Bridge
Blue Nile Road and Railway Bridge
Cooper Bridge
Al Mansheiya Bridge
Shambat Bridge crosses the Nile and connects the neighborhood  to Omdurman

Education
Mashreq University

 University of Bahri

Alzaiem Alazhari University
 *Al-Salama Collage of Science and Technology

References

Populated places in Khartoum (state)
 
Populated places on the Nile